The Russian ambassador's residence in Washington, D.C. historically known as the Mrs. George Pullman House, is located at 1125 16th Street Northwest, Washington, D.C. in the Downtown neighborhood. Until 1994, the building served as the Embassy of Russia (and Embassy of the Soviet Union).

History
Built in 1910, to the designs of architects Nathan C. Wyeth and Francis P. Sullivan, the Beaux-Arts mansion is designated as a contributing property to the Sixteenth Street Historic District, listed on the National Register of Historic Places in 1978. In addition, the building is listed on the District of Columbia Inventory of Historic Sites.

Former occupants include Frank O. Lowden, Natalie Hammond (spouse of John Hays Hammond), and since 1913, Russian ambassadors to the United States.

Events
Beginning in 1970, a vigil was held there, over Jewish emigration from the Soviet Union.

In 1967, U.S. Navy communications specialist John Anthony Walker walked into the embassy.
In 1980, Ronald Pelton, a National Security Agency communications analyst, walked into the Soviet Embassy.

In 1989, during glasnost, Tom Clancy among others were invited to receptions there.

In 1991, there was a protest over events in Lithuania.

References

External links

  Embassy of Russia in Washington, D.C.

Houses completed in 1910
1910 establishments in Washington, D.C.
Diplomatic residences in Washington, D.C.
Russia–United States relations
Historic district contributing properties in Washington, D.C.
Soviet Union–United States relations
Russian ambassadorial residences
Russian-American culture in Washington, D.C.